kabel eins classics is a German pay-tv channel owned by ProSiebenSat.1 Media. A sister channel of kabel eins it first went on air on 1 June 2006. It broadcasts 24 hours a day, mainly films and series from the 1940s to the late 1990s. On Saturdays, films from the 2000s are shown.

Programming
Kabel eins classics shows  films, series and exclusive in-house productions. Broadcasts include Star Trek, The Andromeda Strain, A Foreign Affair and Clear and Present Danger. In addition, series such as The Streets of San Francisco, Vega$, The A-Team and Miami Vice.

Broadcasting
An HD version of the channel is broadcast via Telekom Entertain, Unitymedia and Kabel Deutschland.

On 18 May 2016, ProSiebenSat.1 Media announced its intention to discontinue the distribution via the Sky platform on 30 June 2016, citing "different strategic orientations". It had therefore been decided to terminate broadcasting at the end of the agreed contract term.

Programming

Booker (2008, 2010)
Joe Dancer (2010–present)
Married... with Children (Eine schrecklich nette Familie) (2013-2017)
T. J. Hooker (2017–present)

References

External links
 

Television stations in Germany
Television stations in Austria
Television stations in Switzerland
German-language television stations
Television channels and stations established in 2006
2006 establishments in Germany
ProSiebenSat.1 Media
Mass media in Munich